Maranniyuq (Quechua maran batan or grindstone, -ni, -yuq, suffixes, "the one with a grindstone", also spelled Marannioj) is a mountain in the Cusco Region in Peru, about  high. It is situated in the Acomayo Province, on the border of the districts Acomayo and Acos.

An intermittent stream named Paqlla Wayq'u originates south of Maranniyuq. It flows to the west as a right affluent of the Apurímac River.

References 

Mountains of Peru
Mountains of Cusco Region